Savatije Milošević (1876 – 1905), known as Vojvoda Savatije, was a Serbian hajduk and Chetnik commander.

Life

Early life
Savatije Miličević Milošević (Саватије Миличевић Милошевић) was born in Pavlica, Raška, at the time part of the Ottoman Empire (today Serbia).

At the age of 25, Milošević murdered Pavle Jasnić, a chief of a srez (municipality) in Raška, because of a blood feud, and joined the hajduks (brigands) with whom he was active in the Ottoman Empire. He found refuge in Peć, Kosovo Vilayet, at the house of Albanian kachak Mula Zeka. When the authority started searching for him, he fled to the Principality of Montenegro where he befriended the Serbian emigreés Ranko Tajsić and prota Milan Đurić.

Chetnik Organization
He participated in the famous battle at Čelopek (April 1905). Together with Lazar Kujundžić and Živojin Milovanović he turned and went for Poreče, through Serbia and Podgora, in order to bypass Ottoman harassing in the Kumanovo region. Milovanović, as a Serbian officer, was to establish the headquarters of Western Povardarje. The company was betrayed in Velika Hoča on May 25, 1905, by local Albanians who had initially promised (see besa) their security, thus they were forced to battle the Ottoman Army and neighbouring Albanian kachaks. After a long fight, all of these Chetniks died.

Legacy
A street in the Zvezdara neighbourhood of Belgrade bears his name, as well as a street in the town of Raška.

See also
 List of Chetnik voivodes

References

Sources

Јовановић, Алекса. Војвода Саватије. Почетак српске четничке акције у Маћедонији, Летопис Матице српске 326, 1930.

1876 births
1905 deaths
19th-century Serbian people
20th-century Serbian people
People from Raška, Serbia
Serbian murderers
Serbian guerrillas